Tali is a village in Saarde Parish, Pärnu County in southwestern Estonia.

Cross-country skier Siim Sellis (born 1987) was born in Tali.

References

 

Villages in Pärnu County